The 2014–15 Ranji Trophy was the 81st season of the Ranji Trophy, the premier first-class cricket tournament in India. It was contested by 27 teams divided into three groups of nine teams each. The top three teams from Groups A and B advanced to the quarterfinals along with the top two teams from Group C.

Karnataka retained the title won during the 2013–14 season. In the final, Karun Nair scored 328 runs, the highest total in the final of the Ranji Trophy.

Points system
The 27 teams are divided into three groups of nine teams each. The top three teams from Groups A and B advance to the quarterfinals along with the top two teams from Group C. The winner of this knock-out tournament wins the Ranji Trophy. These knock-out matches are decided on the first innings result if the final result is a draw.

Points in the group stage of the tournament are awarded as follows:

Groups
The groups drawn are as follows:

Group A
 Karnataka
 Bengal
 Mumbai
 Railways
 Uttar Pradesh
 Baroda
 Tamil Nadu
 Jammu and Kashmir
 Madhya Pradesh

Group B
 Maharashtra
 Punjab
 Gujarat
 Saurashtra
 Rajasthan
 Delhi
 Vidarbha
 Haryana
 Odisha

Group C
 Goa
 Himachal Pradesh
 Kerala
 Hyderabad
 Andhra Pradesh
 Assam
 Tripura
 Jharkhand
 Services

Points table

Source:

Group A 

Group B

Group C

Knockout stage

(F) - Advanced to next round on First Innings Lead

Quarter-finals

Semi-finals

Final

Statistics

Most runs

Most wickets

References

External links
 2014–15 Ranji Trophy on ESPNcricinfo

Ranji Trophy seasons
Ranji Trophy Trophy
Ranji Trophy
Ranji Trophy